ENSAE may refer to:

École Nationale de la Statistique et de l'Administration Économique, an educational institute in Paris, France
École nationale supérieure de l'aéronautique et de l'espace, an educational institute in Toulouse, France